The following is a list of notable alumni and faculty of University of Malaya.

Notable alumni

Royalty
 Raja Jaafar ibni Almarhum Raja Muda Musa – Crown Prince of Perak
 Raja Nor Mahani binti Almarhum Raja Shahar Shah – Queen Consort of Perak

Government and politics

Heads of state and government
 Mahathir Mohamad – 4th and 7th Prime Minister of Malaysia
 Abdullah Ahmad Badawi – 5th Prime Minister of Malaysia
 Muhyiddin Yassin – 8th Prime Minister of Malaysia
 Ismail Sabri Yaakob – 9th Prime Minister of Malaysia
 Anwar Ibrahim – 10th Prime Minister of Malaysia
 Benjamin Sheares – 2nd President of Singapore
 S. R. Nathan – 6th President of Singapore

Deputy prime ministers, senior ministers and leaders of the opposition
 Musa Hitam – 5th Deputy Prime Minister of Malaysia 
 Ahmad Zahid Hamidi – 11th and 14th Deputy Prime Minister of Malaysia, 14th Leader of the Opposition
 Fadillah Yusof – 14th Deputy Prime Minister of Malaysia
 Tan Chee Khoon –  2nd Leader of the Opposition

Governors, chief ministers, and mayors  
 Awang Hassan – 5th Yang di-Pertua Negeri of Penang
 Hamdan Sheikh Tahir – 6th Yang di-Pertua Negeri of Penang
 Abdul Rahman Abbas – 7th Yang di-Pertua Negeri of Penang
 Ahmad Fuzi Abdul Razak – 8th Yang di-Pertua Negeri of Penang
 Mohd Khalil Yaakob – 6th Yang di-Pertua Negeri of Malacca, 12th Menteri Besar of Pahang
 Adnan Yaakob – 13th Menteri Besar of Pahang
 Muhammad Muhammad Taib – 11th Menteri Besar of Selangor
 Khir Toyo – 13th Menteri Besar of Selangor 
 Abdul Khalid Ibrahim – 14th Menteri Besar of Selangor
 Mohd Isa Abdul Samad – 9th Menteri Besar of Negeri Sembilan
 Mohamad Hasan – 10th Menteri Besar of Negeri Sembilan
 Abdul Ajib Ahmad – 12th Menteri Besar of Johor 
 Mohamed Khaled Nordin – 15th Menteri Besar of Johor  
 Shahidan Kassim – 7th Menteri Besar of Perlis 
 Abdul Rahim Thamby Chik – 6th Chief Minister of Malacca
 Douglas Uggah Embas – current Deputy Premier of Sarawak
 Ramasamy Palanisamy – current Deputy Chief Minister of Penang II
 Elyas Omar – 3rd Mayor of Kuala Lumpur
 Ahmad Fuad Ismail – 9th Mayor of Kuala Lumpur
 Mhd Amin Nordin Abdul Aziz – 11th Mayor of Kuala Lumpur
 Abu Sujak Mahmud – 1st Mayor of Shah Alam

Federal ministers
 Daim Zainuddin – 5th and 9th Minister of Finance
 Rafidah Aziz –  1st Minister of International Trade and Industry
 Saifuddin Abdullah – 13th and 15th Minister of Foreign Affairs
 Chua Soi Lek – 17th Minister of Health 
 Adham Baba – 21st Minister of Health
 Ahmad Shabery Cheek – 15th Minister of Information
 Maszlee Malik – 22nd Minister of Education
 Shafie Salleh – 1st Minister of Higher Education
 Chan Kong Choy – 10th Minister of Transport 
 Liow Tiong Lai – 14th Minister of Transport
 Anthony Loke – 15th and 17th Minister of Transport 
 Megat Junid Megat Ayub – 3rd Minister of Domestic Trade and Consumer Affairs
 Shahrir Abdul Samad – 6th Minister of Domestic Trade and Consumer Affairs 
 Hasan Malek –  8th Minister of Domestic Trade and Consumer Affairs
 Ong Ka Chuan – 8th Minister of Housing and Local Government
 Nga Kor Ming – 20th Minister of Local Government Development
 Shamsul Anuar Nasarah – 1st Minister of Energy and Natural Resources  
 Takiyuddin Hassan – 2nd Minister of Energy and Natural Resources
 G. Palanivel – 4th Minister of Natural Resources and Environment
 Teresa Kok – 1st Minister of Primary Industries
 Ewon Ebin – 3rd Minister of Science, Innovation and Technology
 Sabbaruddin Chik – 1st Minister of Tourism, Arts and Culture
 Ng Yen Yen – 4th Minister of Tourism
 Shahrizat Abdul Jalil –  1st and 3rd Minister of Women, Family and Community Development
 Zaleha Ismail – 2nd Minister of National Unity and Community Development
 Azalina Othman Said – Minister in the Prime Minister's Department (Law and Institutional Reform)
 Abdul Latiff Ahmad – Minister in the Prime Minister's Department (Special Functions) 
 Mujahid Yusof Rawa – Minister in the Prime Minister's Department (Religious Affairs)
 Jamil Khir Baharom – Minister in the Prime Minister's Department (Islamic Affairs)
 Nor Mohamed Yakcop – Minister in the Prime Minister's Department (Economic Planning)
 Ahmad Husni Hanadzlah – Second Minister of Finance
 Steven Sim – Deputy Minister of Finance
 Liew Chin Tong – Deputy Minister of International Trade and Industry 
 Mah Hang Soon – Deputy Minister of Education
 Lee Boon Chye – Deputy Minister of Health
 Lukanisman Awang Sauni – Deputy Minister of Health
 Hou Kok Chung – Deputy Minister of Higher Education
 Mary Yap – Deputy Minister of Higher Education
 Ahmad Masrizal Muhammad – Deputy Minister of Higher Education 
 Sivarasa Rasiah – Deputy Minister of Rural Development
 Chan Foong Hin - Deputy Minister of Agriculture and Food Security
 Tajuddin Abdul Rahman – Deputy Minister of Agriculture and Agro-based Industry

Speakers and deputy speakers
 Azhar Azizan Harun – 10th Speaker of the Dewan Rakyat
 Johari Abdul – 11th Speaker of the Dewan Rakyat
 Vigneswaran Sanasee – 17th President of the Dewan Negara
 Ngeh Koo Ham – Speaker of the Perak State Legislative Assembly 
 Devamany S. Krishnasamy – Speaker of the Perak State Legislative Assembly

Elected representatives
 Husam Musa – Senator at the Dewan Negara At-large
 Hoh Khai Mun – Senator at the Dewan Negara for Pahang
 Siti Aishah Shaik Ismail – Senator at the Dewan Negara for Penang
 Nuridah Mohd Salleh – Senator at the Dewan Negara for Terengganu
 Che Alias Hamid – Member of Parliament for Kemaman
 Sabri Azit – Member of Parliament for Jerai
 Ahmad Tarmizi Sulaiman – Member of Parliament for Sik
 Hasan Arifin – Member of Parliament for Rompin
 Hasan Bahrom – Member of Parliament for Tampin
 Hassan Abdul Karim – Member of Parliament for Pasir Gudang
 Noor Azmi Ghazali – Member of Parliament for Bagan Serai
 Fasiah Fakeh – Member of Parliament for Sabak Bernam
 Kasthuriraani Patto – Member of Parliament for Batu Kawan
 Tan Kee Kwong – Member of Parliament for Wangsa Maju
 Tan Yee Kew – Member of Parliament for Wangsa Maju
 Cha Kee Chin – Member of Parliament for Rasah
 Wong Hon Wai – Member of Parliament for Bukit Bendera
 Khoo Poay Tiong – Member of Parliament for Kota Melaka
 Chan Foong Hin – Member of Parliament for Kota Kinabalu
 Vivian Wong Shir Yee – Member of Parliament for Sandakan
 Masir Kujat – Member of Parliament for Sri Aman
 Irmohizam Ibrahim – Member of Parliament for Kuala Selangor
 Ariff Sabri Abdul Aziz – Member of Parliament for Raub
 Mohd Misbahul Munir Masduki – Member of Parliament for Parit Buntar
 Syahir Sulaiman – Member of Parliament for Bachok
 Jailani Johari – Member of Parliament for Hulu Terengganu
 Mahadzir Mohd Khir – Member of Parliament for Sungai Petani
 Rahman Ismail – Member of Parliament for Gombak
 Ng Wei Aik – Member of Parliament for Tanjong
 K. S. Nijhar – Member of Parliament for Subang 
 Sivarraajh Chandran – Member of Parliament for Cameron Highlands
 K. Pathmanaban – Member of Parliament for Teluk Kemang
 M. Manoharan – Member of the Selangor State Legislative Assembly for Kota Alam Shah
 Hasan Mohamed Ali – Member of the Selangor State Legislative Assembly for Gombak Setia
 Zawawi Mughni – Member of the Selangor State Legislative Assembly for Sungai Kandis
 Sallehen Mukhyi – Member of the Selangor State Legislative Assembly for Sabak
 Daroyah Alwi – Member of the Selangor State Legislative Assembly for Sementa
 Hee Loy Sian – Member of the Selangor State Legislative Assembly for Kajang
 Wasanthee Sinnasamy – Member of the Perak State Legislative Assembly for Hutan Melintang
 Sheikh Umar Bagharib Ali – Member of the Johor State Legislative Assembly for Paloh
 Tengku Hassan Tengku Omar – Member of the Terengganu State Legislative Assembly for Ladang
 Annuar Rapa'ee – Member of the Sarawak State Legislative Assembly for Nangka
 Rosey Yunus – Member of the Sarawak State Legislative Assembly for Bekenu
 Abu Ubaidah Redza – Member of the Negeri Sembilan State Legislative Assembly for Ampangan
 Ahmad Lebai Sudin – Member of the Kedah State Legislative Assembly for Bukit Lada

International politicians
 Kem Ley – Cambodian activist and political commentator
 Lim Han Hoe – former unofficial Member of the Legislative Council of the Straits Settlements 
 Lim Hock Siew – Singaporean political prisoner
 Ong Pang Boon – former Minister for Education of Singapore
 S. Dhanabalan – former Minister for Foreign Affairs of Singapore
 Shahbaz Gill – Special Assistant to the Prime Minister of Pakistan

International and public service

International relations and foreign affairs
 Ajit Singh – 9th Secretary General of the ASEAN
 Dennis Ignatius – High Commissioner of Malaysia to Canada
 Fauziah Mohd Taib – 12th Ambassador of Malaysia to the Kingdom of the Netherlands
 Razali Ismail – 51st President of the United Nations General Assembly

Military, police and security
 Azam Baki – 6th Chief Commissioner of the Malaysian Anti-Corruption Commission (MACC)
 Mohamad Fuzi Harun – 11th Inspector-General of Police
 Mohd Asghar Khan Goriman Khan – 20th Chief of the Royal Malaysian Air Force
 Norian Mai – 6th Inspector-General of Police
 Noor Rashid Ibrahim – 19th Deputy Inspector-General of Police

Civil service
 Abdullah Mohd Salleh – 5th Chief Secretary to the Government of Malaysia
 Abdullah Ayub – 6th Chief Secretary to the Government of Malaysia
 Hashim Aman – 7th Chief Secretary to the Government of Malaysia
 Samsudin Osman – 11th Chief Secretary to the Government of Malaysia
 Mohd Sidek Hassan – 12th Chief Secretary to the Government of Malaysia
 Ali Hamsa – 13th Chief Secretary to the Government of Malaysia 
 Ismail Bakar – 14th Chief Secretary to the Government of Malaysia
 Ahmad Kamil Jaafar – 8th Secretary General of the Ministry of Foreign Affairs
 Abdul Halim bin Ali – 9th Secretary General of the Ministry of Foreign Affairs
 Othman bin Hashim – 14th Secretary General of the Ministry of Foreign Affairs
 Muhammad Shahrul Ikram Yaakob – 16th Secretary General of the Ministry of Foreign Affairs
 Thong Yaw Hong – 6th Secretary General of the Ministry of Finance
 Mohd. Sheriff Mohd. Kassim – 8th Secretary General of the Ministry of Finance
 Clifford F. Herbert – 9th Secretary General of the Ministry of Finance
 Aris Bin Othman @ Osman – 10th Secretary General of the Ministry of Finance
 Samsudin B. Hitam – 12th Secretary General of the Ministry of Finance 
 Izzuddin Bin Dali – 13th Secretary General of the Ministry of Finance
 Wan Abd Aziz bin Wan Abdullah – 14th Secretary General of the Ministry of Finance
 Mohd Irwan Serigar Abdullah – 15th Secretary General of the Ministry of Finance
 Asri bin Hamidon – 17th Secretary General of the Ministry of Finance
 Ramon Navaratnam – 6th Secretary General of the Ministry of Transport
 Othman B. Rijal – 9th Secretary General of the Ministry of Transport
 Long See Wool – 13th Secretary General of the Ministry of Transport
 Saripuddin Bin Hj. Kasim – 15th Secretary General of the Ministry of Transport
 Sukarti Wakiman – 8th State Secretary of Sabah

Law
 Mohamed Raus Sharif – 8th Chief Justice of Malaysia, 8th President of the Court of Appeal of Malaysia
 Tengku Maimun Tuan Mat – 10th Chief Justice of Malaysia
 Ahmad Maarop – 10th President of the Court of Appeal of Malaysia, 10th Chief Judge of Malaya 
 Rohana Yusuf – 11th President of the Court of Appeal of Malaysia
 Zaharah Ibrahim – 11th Chief Judge of Malaya 
 Azahar Mohamed – 12th Chief Judge of Malaya
 Abang Iskandar Abang Hashim – 6th Chief Judge of Sabah and Sarawak  
 Abdul Gani Patail – 6th Attorney General of Malaysia
 Idrus Harun – 9th Attorney General of Malaysia 
 Steven Thiru – 31st president of the Malaysian Bar Council
 Muhammad Shafee Abdullah – Commissioner of the Human Rights Commission of Malaysia
 Harmindar Singh Dhaliwal – Judge of the Federal Court of Malaysia
 Mohd.Zawawi Salleh – Judge of the Federal Court of Malaysia
 Abdul Rahman Sebli – Judge of the Federal Court of Malaysia
 Rhozariah Bujang – Judge of the Federal Court of Malaysia
 Hasnah Mohammed Hashim – Judge of the Federal Court of Malaysia
 Zabariah Mohd. Yusof – Judge of the Federal Court of Malaysia
 Zaleha Yusof – Judge of the Federal Court of Malaysia
 Saldi Isra – Justice of the Constitutional Court of Indonesia

Academia
 Atta ur Rehman Khan – computer scientist 
 Syed Muhammad Naquib al-Attas – Islamic scholar and philosopher 
 Chuah Hean Teik – President of the Federation of Engineering Institutions of Asia and the Pacific (FEIAP)
 Shamsul Amri Baharuddin – anthropologist, Distinguished Professor of Social Anthropology, National University of Malaysia
 Harith Ahmad – physicist, Distinguished Professor of physics, University of Malaya
 Margaret Clark (political scientist) – political scientist, Emeritus Professor of Politics, Victoria University of Wellington
 Lee Poh Ping – political scientist, recipient of the Order of the Rising Sun 
 Werry Darta Taifur – economist, Rector of Andalas University
 Mohd Kamal Hassan – Islamic scholar, 3rd Rector of International Islamic University Malaysia
 Syed Arabi Idid – journalist, 4th Rector of International Islamic University Malaysia
 Zaleha Kamarudin – lawyer, 5th Rector of International Islamic University Malaysia
 Ungku Aziz – economist, 3rd Vice-Chancellor of the University of Malaya
 Rayson Huang – chemist, 10th Vice-Chancellor of the University of Hong Kong
 Wang Gungwu – historian, 11th Vice-Chancellor of the University of Hong Kong
 Khoo Kay Kim – historian, emeritus professor of the University of Malaya
 Mak Joon Wah – physician, Professor of Pathology and Vice President of International Medical University
 Megat Burhainuddin – physician, former Vice-Chancellor of Nilai University
 Khasnor Johan – author and historian 
 Mohd Fadzilah Kamsah – lecturer and motivational speaker

Business and economics
 Ali Abul Hassan bin Sulaiman – 6th Governor of Bank Negara Malaysia
 Zeti Akhtar Aziz – 7th Governor of Bank Negara Malaysia
 Muhammad bin Ibrahim – 8th Governor of Bank Negara Malaysia
 Ahmad Sarji Abdul Hamid – Former Chairman of Permodalan Nasional Berhad
 Mohd Daud Bakar –  Chairman of the Shariah Advisory Councils of Bank Negara Malaysia and the Securities Commission of Malaysia
 Mustapha Kamal Abu Bakar – Founder of MK Land Holdings Berhad
 Liew Kee Sin – Founder of SP Setia Berhad
 Syed Amin Aljeffri – Former Deputy President of the Malay Chamber of Commerce
 Chen Lip Keong – Founder of NagaCorp Ltd
 G. Gnanalingam – Chairman of Westports Holdings
 Teh Hong Piow – Founder and Chairman of Public Bank Berhad
 Lim Wee-Chai – Founder and Chairman of Top Glove Corporation Bhd
 Wong Teek Son – CEO and Executive Chairman of Riverstone Holdings Limited
 Oh Kuang Eng – Group CEO and Executive Chairman of Mi Technovation Berhad
 Eng Piow Tan – Group Managing Director of Mitrajaya Holdings Berhad
 Abdul Kadier Sahib – Member of the Board of Directors of Serba Dinamik Holdings Berhad
 Alireza Yaghoubi – Co-Founder of AirGo Design

Literature and the arts
 Muhammad Haji Salleh – writer and critic, 6th Sasterawan Negara
 Anwar Ridhwan – novelist, 10th Sasterawan Negara 
 Baha Zain – writer, 12th Sasterawan Negara
 Zurinah Hassan – writer, 13th and first female Sasterawan Negara
 Siti Zainon Ismail – novelist, 14th Sasterawan Negara
 Faisal Tehrani – author and playwright, Anugerah Seni Negara winner 
 Ayman Rashdan Wong – writer and geopolitical analyst, Anugerah Buku Negara winner
 Edwin Thumboo –  poet and academician, 1979 Southeast Asian Writers Award winner
 Adibah Amin – columnist, 1983 Southeast Asian Writers Award winner
 Gopal Baratham – author and neurosurgeon, 1991 Southeast Asian Writers Award winner
 Catherine Lim – author, 1999 Southeast Asian Writers Award winner
 Rex Shelley – author and engineer, 2007 Southeast Asian Writers Award winner   
 Malim Ghozali PK – novelist, 2013 Southeast Asian Writers Award winner 
 Shirley Geok-lin Lim –  poet, 1980 Commonwealth Poetry Prize winner
 Dinsman – poet
 Hilary Tham – poet
 Anis Sabirin – writer
 Daniel Dorall – sculptor

Science and medicine
 Faiz Khaleed – Malaysian astronaut candidate
 Salma Ismail – first Malaysian Malay woman to qualify as a doctor
 Siti Aisyah Alias – marine polar researcher, Deputy Director of the National Antarctic Research Centre (NARC)
 Awang Bulgiba Awang Mahmud – epidemiologist, first Malaysian doctor to be awarded a Doctor of Philosophy (PhD) in Health Informatics
 Chen Su Lan – physician, one of the first medical school graduates in Singapore
 Mak Joon Wah – physician, director of the WHO Collaborating Centre for Lymphatic Filariasis
 T. A. Sinnathuray – obstetrician, Fellow of the Royal College of Surgeons 
 Satwant Singh Dhaliwal – geneticist
 Swee Lay Thein – hematologist
 Susan Lim – parasitologist
 Gloria Lim – mycologist, former director of Singapore's National Institute of Education
 Kalai Mathee – Professor of Microbiology at the Florida International University
 Malini Olivo – Professor of Biophotonics at the National University of Ireland, Galway 
 Victor Lim – microbiologist, Pro Vice-Chancellor of International Medical University

Sports
 Shalin Zulkifli – Malaysian ten pin bowler, former world champion and ranked number one in Asia
 Haziq Kamaruddin – Malaysian sport archer, Asian Games medalist
 Irfan Shamsuddin – Malaysian discus thrower, Southeast Asian Games medalist
 Woon Khe Wei – Malaysian badminton player, Asian Games medalist
 Vivian Hoo Kah Mun – Malaysian badminton player, Asian Games medalist
 Jasmine Lai Pui Yee – Malaysian diver, Southeast Asian Games medalist
 Bryan Nickson Lomas – Malaysian diver, Asian Games medalist
 Pandelela Rinong – Malaysian diver, two-time Olympic medalist

Media and entertainment
 Sudirman Arshad – singer and songwriter, Asia's Number One Performer at the Salem Music Award London, 1989
 Ernie Zakri – singer and actress
 Azwan Ali – media personality
 Najwa Latif - singer
 Rynn Lim – singer 
 Victor Gu – newscaster 
 Gary Yap – Malaysian television personality
 Aznil Nawawi – TV host and media personality
 Uyaina Arshad – Actress, TV host and media personality

Religion and activism
 Luqman Abdullah  – 8th Mufti of the Federal Territories
 Siti Hasmah – Spouse of the Prime Minister of Malaysia
 Anwar Fazal – social activist, 1982 Right Livelihood Award recipient
 Nalla Tan – women's rights advocate
 Charles Hector Fernandez – human rights advocate and lawyer
 Amani Williams Hunt Abdullah – social activist and Indigenous Malaysian lawyer

Notable faculty
 Pendeta Za'aba – Academician, known as the Father of the Modern Malay Language
 Jomo Kwame Sundaram – Member of Council of Eminent Persons, Emeritus Professor of Economics, University of Malaya
 Mohamad Ariff Md Yusof – 9th Speaker of the Dewan Rakyat
 Ramli Ngah Talib – 8th Menteri Besar of Perak, 7th Speaker of the Dewan Rakyat
 Abdul Ghani Othman – 14th Menteri Besar of Johor, former Dean of the Faculty of Economics, University of Malaya
 Syed Hussein Alatas – 4th Vice-Chancellor of University of Malaya
 Md Hashim Yahaya – 4th Mufti of the Federal Territories, former director of the Academy of Islamic Studies, University of Malaya
 Khairuddin Mohamed Yusof – Emeritus Professor of Medicine, former Deputy Vice-Chancellor of University of Malaya
 Lam Sai Kit – Emeritus Professor of Medicine, University of Malaya, prominent researcher of the Nipah virus
 Shad Saleem Faruqi – Emeritus Professor of Law, University of Malaya
 Rajah Rasiah – Distinguished Professor of Economics, University of Malaya 
 Azmi Sharom – Deputy Chairman of the Election Commission, former associate professor of law, University of Malaya
 Farish A. Noor – former associate professor at the Rajaratnam School of International Studies
 Sutan Takdir Alisyahbana – former professor and director of the Academy of Malay Studies, University of Malaya 
 Wolfgang Drechsler – Honorary Professor at the Institute for Innovation and Public Purpose (IIPP), University College London

References

Malaya